Enrique "Kike" Márquez Climent (born 23 July 1989) is a Spanish footballer who plays for Córdoba CF mainly as a left winger.

Club career
Born in Sanlúcar de Barrameda, Province of Cádiz, Márquez played youth football with local club Atlético Sanluqueño CF, making his senior debut in the 2006–07 season in the Tercera División. After returning to youth football with Villarreal CF, he joined UD Almería B also in the fourth division.

Márquez left the Andalusians after two years (achieving promotion in his second), signing with another reserve team and also in his native region, Recreativo de Huelva B. On 26 September 2010 he made his first appearance with the main squad, starting in a 1–1 away draw against SD Ponferradina in the Segunda División.

In June 2011, Márquez joined Segunda División B side Real Betis B. He continued to compete in that tier the following campaigns, representing Sanluqueño, Cádiz CF, Racing de Ferrol, Marbella FC and Extremadura UD. He achieved promotion to division two in 2018 with the latter, contributing ten goals to this feat.

References

External links

Beticopedia profile 

1989 births
Living people
People from Sanlúcar de Barrameda
Sportspeople from the Province of Cádiz
Spanish footballers
Footballers from Andalusia
Association football wingers
Segunda División players
Segunda División B players
Tercera División players
Primera Federación players
Atlético Sanluqueño CF players
UD Almería B players
Atlético Onubense players
Recreativo de Huelva players
Betis Deportivo Balompié footballers
Cádiz CF players
Racing de Ferrol footballers
Marbella FC players
Extremadura UD footballers
Albacete Balompié players
Córdoba CF players